Kanokogi (written: 鹿子木) is a Japanese surname. Notable people with the surname include:

Rena Kanokogi (1935–2009), American judoka
Ryohei Kanokogi, Japanese judoka
, Japanese painter
, Japanese professor

Japanese-language surnames